Strawberry tree is a common name for:

Arbutus, a genus in the family Ericaceae with edible red fruits
Arbutus unedo, the tree from which the genus Arbutus derives its name
Arbutus andrachne, known as Greek strawberry tree
Calycophyllum candidissimum, in the family Calycophyllum
Cornus capitata, a species of dogwood known as Himalayan strawberry-tree
Muntingia calabura, in the family Malvaceae, native to the American tropics
Myrica rubra, in the family Myricaceae, referred to as the Chinese strawberry tree

Other uses
Strawberry Tree (solar energy device)
Strawberry Tree (national symbol of Italy)
The Strawberry Tree, a 2011 Spanish-language experimental film

See also
 Strawberries and Cream Tree, a graft hybrid cherry tree